Thomas Stonor may refer to:
 Thomas Stonor, 3rd Baron Camoys, British peer and politician
 Thomas Stonor, 7th Baron Camoys, British peer, banker and Lord Chamberlain